Howard's Way is an outdoor 2007 art installation comprising four stainless steel sculptures by American artist Lee Kelly, located in downtown Portland, Oregon.

Description and history

The work was commissioned by the Housing Authority of Portland for the downtown development project called "The Civic/The Morrison", and funded by the City of Portland's Percent for Art program and Civic Housing Development Services. The "suite" of sculptures were installed at the Civic Apartments (635 Southwest 19th Avenue) at West Burnside Street and Northwest 19th Avenue. Howard's Way shares its name with the plaza between two buildings in which it was installed; both are named for Howard Shapiro, the Housing Authority's former chair. It was dedicated in October 2007.

See also

 2007 in art

References

External links
 The Morrison, Home Forward
 Art Notes (November 2007), Regional Arts & Culture Council

2007 establishments in Oregon
2007 sculptures
Outdoor sculptures in Portland, Oregon
Sculptures by Lee Kelly
Southwest Portland, Oregon
Stainless steel sculptures in Oregon